Jónasson is a surname of Icelandic origin, meaning son of Jónas. In Icelandic names the name is not strictly a surname, but a patronymic. The name refers to:
Hermann Jónasson (1896–1976), Icelandic politician; prime minister of Iceland 1934–42 and 1956–58
Kristján B. Jónasson (contemporary), Icelandic book publisher

Surnames